The Grand Avenue station was a station on the demolished section of the BMT Myrtle Avenue Line in Brooklyn, New York City. The station was opened on April 27, 1889 at the intersection of Myrtle Avenue and Grand Avenue in Brooklyn next to the Myrtle Avenue station of the BMT Lexington Avenue Line, which opened four years earlier.  It had two tracks and two side platforms, and had connections not only to that station, but also to Myrtle Avenue Line streetcars. The next southbound stop was Washington Avenue. The next northbound stop was Franklin Avenue. The connection to the Lexington Avenue el station lasted until that station closed on October 13, 1950. Grand Avenue closed on January 21, 1953, while the rest of the line southwest of Broadway was operational until October 4, 1969.

References

External links 

 

Park Ave El; 1885-1891 (The Joe KorNer)

Defunct BMT Myrtle Avenue Line stations
Railway stations in the United States opened in 1889
Railway stations closed in 1953
1889 establishments in New York (state)
1953 disestablishments in New York (state)
Former elevated and subway stations in Brooklyn